The University of Chile Student Federation (Federación de Estudiantes de la Universidad de Chile [abbr. FECh]) is an organization that represents all the students enrolled in undergraduate and post-graduate courses at the University of Chile. The student organizations of the different undergraduate schools are also federated within the FECh. Camila Vallejo Dowling, a graduate student in geography from the Faculty of Architecture and Urbanism of the University of Chile, assumed the post president of FECh in November 2010.  She was defeated in her bid for re-election on 7 December 2011 by Gabriel Boric, a Law graduate. The president for the 2013 period was Andrés Fielbaum. The position after that held by Melissa Sepúlveda, a medical student, who is a member of the Frente de Estudiantes Libertarios (Libertarian Student Front) - an anarchist organisation.

The Federation

The Federation defines itself as 
Democratic and representative: because its representatives are elected via universal and secret ballot, freely and informed, seeking a maximum level of participation by those it represents via all the channels deemed necessary, creating spaces whereby students can express their concerns and actions.
Autonomous: because its organization and decisions are independent of the university authority, from the government in office and of any other organization or authority.
Pluralist and unified: because it gives the right for all ideological currents to be represented, which respect the principles, the nature and objectives of the Federation. The Federation must be one for all the University of Chile, and it reject divisiveness and parallelism.
In solidarity and compromised with the needs of the students, with social justice, and with the construction of a more just social order, one grounded in liberty, democracy, sovereignty, and self-determination; with the unity of all people, the defence of the environment, and the respect and promotion of human rights.

History 
The FECh was founded on October 21, 1906, with the unconditional support of the Radical Party politician and University of Chile law professor Valentin Letelier - who served as rector of the university from 1906 until 1913. The goal of the organization was to defend the rights and opinions of the student body of the University of Chile and to grant social assistance to workers and the dispossessed. The FECh became the first federation in Chile and first student organization of its type in the Latin American continent. Throughout its history it has played a notable role in the social and political history of Chile, playing a significant role in the fall of the Carlos Ibáñez del Campo dictatorship in the 1950s and in the university reform processes initiated at the Catholic University of Valparaiso in 1967. After the military coup d'état on September 11, 1973 the activities of the FECh were proscribed and many of its leaders were subjected to persecution. Between 1978 and 1981 the FECh was replaced by a new right-wing student federation, the Federación de centros de estudiantes de la Universidad de Chile (a.k.a., FeCECh), this quasi  student federation was directly controlled by non-academic rectors appointed by the military government of Augusto Pinochet.  FECECh disbanded itself in 1984. During the 1980s the FECh played a leading role in student mobilizations in opposition to the Pinochet regime, and the numerous student mobilizations that have occurred since the return to democracy in 1990. In June 2016, a group of Chilean students, affiliated with the FECh, and dissatisfied with the government of Chilean President Michelle Bachelet, broke into the Church of National Gratitude during a planned protest. They ransacked the church and destroyed several items, among them a 9 foot tall crucifix.

See also 
University of Chile
Education in Chile
2011 Chilean protests

References 

Students' unions in Chile
1906 establishments in Chile
Student organizations established in 1906